Hamidabad (also Romanized as Ḩamīdābād) is a village in Sarpaniran Rural District, in the Central District of Pasargad County, Fars Province, Iran. At the 2006 census, its population was 21, in 6 families.

References 

Populated places in Pasargad County